BLQ or blq may refer to:

 BLQ, the IATA code for Bologna Guglielmo Marconi Airport, Italy
 blq, the ISO 639-3 code for Baluan-Pam language, Papua New Guinea